Luigi Gui (26 September 1914 – 26 April 2010) was an Italian politician and philosopher.

Biography 
Gui was born in Padua (Veneto). He graduated in philosophy at the Catholic University in Milan. He was an officer of the Alpini corps of the Italian Army, and fought in USSR during World War II. Later, he was a member of the Italian Constituent Assembly which later became the modern Italian Parliament. He was deputy and senator from 1948 to 1983.

He served as Minister of labour and social security, Minister of education, Minister of health, Minister of the Interior, Minister of Defense and Minister of Public Administration.

He died on 26 April 2010, at the age of 95.

References

External links
Luigi Gui at Italian Chamber of Deputies, VI Legislature

1914 births
2010 deaths
Politicians from Padua
Christian Democracy (Italy) politicians
Education ministers of Italy
Italian Ministers of the Interior
Italian Ministers of Defence
Italian Ministers of Health
Members of the Constituent Assembly of Italy
Deputies of Legislature I of Italy
Deputies of Legislature II of Italy
Deputies of Legislature III of Italy
Deputies of Legislature IV of Italy
Deputies of Legislature V of Italy
Deputies of Legislature VI of Italy
Senators of Legislature VII of Italy
Deputies of Legislature VIII of Italy
Italian military personnel of World War II
Italian resistance movement members
Università Cattolica del Sacro Cuore alumni